Petra Kvitová was the defending champion, and successfully defended her title, defeating Magdaléna Rybáriková in the final, 4–6, 6–1, 6–2.

Seeds

Draw

Finals

Top half

Bottom half

Qualifying

Seeds

Qualifiers

Draw

First qualifier

Second qualifier

Third qualifier

Fourth qualifier

References

External links
 Main Draw
 Qualifying Draw

Birmingham Classic- Singles
Singles